Robert Verrill Kuhn  (January 5, 1922 – November 28, 2009), professionally known as Bob Keane, and also sometimes known as Bob Keene, was an American musician, producer and the founder and owner of the record label Del-Fi Records. He was the producer and manager of Ritchie Valens and Pinoy star Josephine Roberto, aka Banig.

Life and career

Early years
Bob Keane was born Robert Verrill Kuhn in Manhattan Beach, California, in 1922. He was a clarinet player, and his ambition was to front a big band like his idol, Benny Goodman. He did so and in 1938 (at age 16), he was setting up to play his first show at Glendale Junior College and was approached by an employee of KFWB, a Los Angeles radio station, who wanted to broadcast the concert on air to replace a canceled scheduled show. The next day Keane received a phone call from an agent at MCA who had heard the broadcast on KFWB, and who wanted to sign Keane. MCA billed him as "The World's Youngest Bandleader."

MCA dropped Keane in 1941 as they felt he was likely to be drafted. Keane decided to enlist in the Army Air Force, and was retired from active service due to a lung infection. He returned to Los Angeles and continued to play clarinet in several bands. In 1950, he was offered a job as a conductor on The Hank McCune Show, a new radio show. After the first episode, the producer approached Bob and told him that he would have to change his name, as the announcer was pronouncing Kuhn as "Coon." A band colleague suggested Keen, after a popular Woody Herman song, "Peachy Keen," to which Bob decided to add an 'e'. Later on in life he changed this to Keane.

Sam Cooke and Keen Records
By 1955 Keane was playing clarinet in several bars and clubs around Los Angeles, and one evening he met businessman John Siamas, who persuaded Bob to set up a record label with him. The label would be known as Keen Records, with Bob working as an A&R man. He was given an acetate of two songs by Sam Cooke, who at the time using his original surname, Cook, and singing in a gospel group called The Soul Stirrers. On the acetate was "Summertime" and "You Send Me". Sam Cook was signed to a three-year contract with Keen, his surname changed just as Bob's had been, and the songs were subsequently pressed and released as the first single on Keen Records. Originally "Summertime" was intended to be the A-side, and sold moderately. It was only when a DJ played the B-side that the record took off, and by November 25, 1957, it reached #1 on the Billboard chart.  	

At this point, despite Keen Records having earned over $1,000,000 from sales of "You Send Me," Bob had only an oral contract with Siamas. Upon asking when the corporation was to be formed and when he was likely to receive stock certificates for the company, he received a letter asking for him to invest $5000 (which, of course, he did not have) into his own company should he wish to remain a partner. He realized that he had been tricked into finding a hit record and then pushed out of the company.

Del-Fi
While waiting for legal proceedings against Siamas to begin, Bob's wife suggested that he set up another label, and approach someone else who had also been duped by Siamas to put up the money to do so. Taking its name from Delphi, the Greek god of music and inspiration, the new label was named Del-Fi Records. The first release was "Caravan" by Henri Rose, which sold well, and led to Warner Bros. Records offering Keane $8000 for Henri Rose's contract, which he accepted, and which enabled him to buy out his business partner. Another early Del-Fi release was "Chicken Grabber" by The Nite Hawks, which although not a success at the time, was featured in John Waters' film Pink Flamingos.

In March 1958, Keane discovered Ritchie Valens performing a Saturday matinee show in a movie theatre in Pacoima and invited Valens to audition in the basement of his home, where he had set up a small recording studio. A formal contract was signed, and Valens and Keane spent hours in the basement working on songs together. Among the songs was Come On Let's Go, which was recorded in Gold Star Studios in March 27, 1958, and released in May the same year as Valens' first single soon after. This single and the follow-ups, "Donna" and "La Bamba," were smash hits. Keane (whom Valens nicknamed "Bobbo") served as Valens' manager as well as producer, booking shows for him across America and several TV performances. In the film La Bamba, the story of Ritchie Valens, Bob Keane was played by Joe Pantoliano.

After Valens' death in February 1959, Del-Fi records continued, and one of the next signings was eden ahbez, best known for his song "Nature Boy." By this point, and totally unlike the rest of the major labels in Hollywood, Del-Fi had an "open door" policy - anybody with music they wanted to be released could approach the Del-Fi offices and get it played to Bob Keane. In an interview, he remarked, "I'll listen to anyone, even if they bring 'em in on a stretcher."

Other notable artists on Del-Fi over the next few years included Chan Romero, best known for his song "Hippy Hippy Shake," Little Caesar and the Romans, Ron Holden, Johnny Crawford, Brenda Holloway, the first records released by Frank Zappa, and surf bands The Surfaris, The Lively Ones and The Centurians.

In 1964 he signed Bobby Fuller and his band, The Bobby Fuller Four, to Del-Fi, and released several singles and two albums under a subsidiary label just for the band called Mustang Records. Their biggest song, "I Fought the Law," was released in October 1965 and was a hit in the United States and the United Kingdom. The band's career was brought to an abrupt end when the corpse of Bobby Fuller was found inside his mother's car in the parking lot of his Hollywood apartment on July 18, 1966.

In 1965, Keane also set up a subsidiary label for R&B music, called Bronco, and employed Barry White as an in-house producer, musician and A&R man for the new label. In late 1966, Keane also released an album titled An Afternoon Affair, under the pseudonym "Verrill Keene," which showcases his talent as an accomplished clarinet player.

After Del-Fi
By 1967, with Del-Fi's biggest band, The Bobby Fuller Four, disbanded, Del-Fi was closed down. Keane embarked upon a career selling burglar alarm systems, mainly to celebrities, and oversaw the music career of his two sons, known professionally as The Keane Brothers.

Ritchie Valens' life and music came back into the public eye with the release of the film La Bamba in 1987, and seven years later, two of Del-Fi's surf records by The Lively Ones and The Centurians were used in the film Pulp Fiction. Del-Fi was resurrected and released numerous CDs of its original material, and signed some new acts to the label as well. In September 2003, Keane sold the Del-Fi catalog to the Warner Music Group.

Death
Keane was diagnosed with non-Hodgkin's lymphoma when he was 87, and died of kidney failure on November 28, 2009.

See also
Keen Records

References

External links
Del-Fi's Keane Opens Door, Colin Devenish, Rolling Stone, on line, article dated September 28, 2004.
[ Bob Keane] at Allmusic
Article on Keane's labels
Findagrave Memorial

1922 births
2009 deaths
Musicians from Manhattan Beach, California
Record producers from California
American clarinetists
Deaths from kidney failure
20th-century American musicians
Ritchie Valens